APSC may refer to:
 APS-C, the Advanced Photo System type-C image sensor format
 The Association of Southeast Asian Nations Political-Security Community
 The Assam Public Service Commission
 The Arkansas Public Service Commission
 The Australian Public Service Commission
 The Army Public School, Chennai, a public school in Chennai, India
 APSC Pariyaram, the Academy of Pharmaceutical Sciences, Pariyaram
 The African People's Solidarity Committee, a committee of the African People's Socialist Party